Danville Public Library may refer to:

Danville Public Library (Danville, Illinois), listed on the NRHP in Illinois
Danville Public Library (Danville, Virginia), listed on the NRHP in Virginia